George Krause (born 1937) is an American artist photographer, now retired from the University of Houston where he established the photography department.

Krause has published a few books of photographs and his work has been collected by many institutions. He lives and works in Wimberley, Texas.

Life and work
Krause was born in 1937 in Philadelphia, Pennsylvania.

During the 1950s, Krause studied painting, drawing, sculpture, and photography at the Philadelphia College of Art (PCA). While serving in the US Army between 1957 and 1959, he turned his full attention to photography, spending all his free time documenting the culture of the black neighborhoods in the racially segregated communities of South Carolina.

Krause later moved in a less documentary direction, seeking images that were more ambiguous and open to viewer interpretation with projects dealing with cemetery monuments, religious statuary, and an atypical series of nudes.

In the volume George Krause: A Retrospective published in 1991 in conjunction with a major mid-career exhibition, Anne Wilkes Tucker, the curator of photography at the Museum of Fine Arts, Houston, observed: “Krause explores intensely personal themes rooted in basic human concerns: sensuality, mortality, and mystery....His work is perpetually relevant because his issues are basic and vital to the human condition. Few viewers leave his exhibitions unmoved—be it by indignation, horror, pathos, or wonder.”

Krause lives and works in Wimberley, Texas.

Publications
George Krause 1. Haverford, Pennsylvania: Toll Armstrong Publishers, 1972. Book, introduction by Mark Power.
I Nudi. Philadelphia: Mancini Gallery, 1980.
Qui Riposa: Alternative Lives. New Haven, Connecticut, 1987. Booklet of photographs by Krause and texts by Rosellen Brown.
Krause Roman. Houston, Texas: Harris Gallery, 1991. Leaflet, afterword by Mark Power.
George Krause: Universal Issues. Houston, TX: Rice University Press, 1991. Book, introduction by Anne Wilkes Tucker.
George Krause: a Retrospective. Houston, TX: Rice University Press, 1991. . Edited by Anne Wilkes Tucker.

Grants
Fulbright-Hays Fellowship to Spain in 1963
Commission from Citizens’ Council on City Planning and the Philadelphia Foundation in 1966
Guggenheim Fellowship in 1967
Philadelphia College of Art Alumni Award in 1970
National Endowment for the Arts in 1973
Bicentennial Commission, Philadelphia in 1975
First Prix de Rome in Photography Guggenheim Fellowship in 1976-77
Photographer in Residence, American Academy in Rome National Endowment for the Arts in 1979-80
Unicolor Grant in 1983
National Endowment for the Arts, Filmmaking in 1985
Cultural Arts Council of Houston in 1986
Texas Artist of the Year in 1993
Tylee Cottage Residency, Whanganui, New Zealand in 1997
Artist in Residence at Milwaukee Institute of Art and Design, Milwaukee, Wisconsin in 2007

Collections

Krause's work is held in the following permanent collections:
Museum of Modern Art, New York City
Philadelphia Museum of Art
Museum of Fine Arts, Houston
George Eastman House, Rochester, NY
Library of Congress
Bibliothèque nationale de France, Paris
Carpenter Center for the Visual Arts, Harvard University
Art Institute of Chicago
Museum of Fine Arts, Boston
Milwaukee Art Museum

References

External links

American photographers
1937 births
Living people
University of Houston faculty
University of the Arts (Philadelphia) alumni
Artists from Philadelphia
United States Army soldiers